Falonne Kuzoya Pambani (born 2 August 1994) is a DR Congolese footballer who plays as a forward for Tanzanian club Simba Queens and the DR Congo women's national team.

International career
Pambani capped for the DR Congo at senior level during the 2012 African Women's Championship.

See also
 List of Democratic Republic of the Congo women's international footballers

References

1994 births
Living people
Democratic Republic of the Congo women's footballers
Women's association football forwards
Simba S.C. players
Democratic Republic of the Congo women's international footballers
Democratic Republic of the Congo expatriate footballers
Democratic Republic of the Congo expatriate sportspeople in Tanzania
Expatriate women's footballers in Tanzania
21st-century Democratic Republic of the Congo people